Grabovac (also known as Eirene's Town) is a medieval fortification that is located 3 km west of Trstenik, on a hill above West Morava.

History 

The original fortification was built during the reign of Justinian I, the emperor of the Eastern Roman Empire, in the 6th century. The town flourished under administration of Princess Milica of Serbia. Its nickname however implicates that the latest fortification was built under the overwatch of Eirene Kantakouzene, the wife of Đurađ Branković, infamous in the folk for putting maximum work load onto the peasantry for building very demanding fortifications on steep mountain tops. There are several medieval towns in Serbia that are nicknamed as Eirene's Town.

See also
Cultural Monuments of Rasina District

Buildings and structures in Serbia